NetBSD is a free and open-source Unix operating system based on the Berkeley Software Distribution (BSD). It was the first open-source BSD descendant officially released after 386BSD was forked. It continues to be actively developed and is available for many platforms, including servers, desktops, handheld devices, and embedded systems.

The NetBSD project focuses on code clarity, careful design, and portability across many computer architectures. Its source code is publicly available and permissively licensed.

History 
NetBSD was originally derived from the 4.3BSD-Reno release of the Berkeley Software Distribution from the Computer Systems Research Group of the University of California, Berkeley, via their Net/2 source code release and the 386BSD project. The NetBSD project began as a result of frustration within the 386BSD developer community with the pace and direction of the operating system's development. The four founders of the NetBSD project, Chris Demetriou, Theo de Raadt, Adam Glass, and Charles Hannum, felt that a more open development model would benefit the project: one centered on portable, clean, correct code. They aimed to produce a unified, multi-platform, production-quality, BSD-based operating system. The name "NetBSD" was chosen based on the importance and growth of networks such as the Internet at that time, and the distributed, collaborative nature of its development.

The NetBSD source code repository was established on 21 March 1993 and the first official release, NetBSD 0.8, was made on 19 April 1993. This was derived from 386BSD 0.1 plus the version 0.2.2 unofficial patchkit, with several programs from the Net/2 release missing from 386BSD re-integrated, and various other improvements. The first multi-platform release, NetBSD 1.0, was made in October 1994, and being updated with 4.4BSD-Lite sources, it was free of all legally encumbered 4.3BSD Net/2 code. Also in 1994, for disputed reasons, one of the founders, Theo de Raadt, was removed from the project. He later founded a new project, OpenBSD, from a forked version of NetBSD 1.0 near the end of 1995.
In 1998, NetBSD 1.3 introduced the pkgsrc packages collection.

Until 2004, NetBSD 1.x releases were made at roughly annual intervals, with minor "patch" releases in between. From release 2.0 onwards, NetBSD uses semantic versioning, and each major NetBSD release corresponds to an incremented major version number, i.e. the major releases following 2.0 are 3.0, 4.0 and so on. The previous minor releases are now divided into two categories: x.y "stable" maintenance releases and x.y.z releases containing only security and critical fixes.

Features

Portability 

As the project's motto ("Of course it runs NetBSD" ) suggests, NetBSD has been ported to a large number of 32- and 64-bit architectures. These range from VAX minicomputers to Pocket PC PDAs. As of 2019, NetBSD supports 59 hardware platforms (across 16 different instruction sets). The kernel and userland for these platforms are all built from a central unified source-code tree managed by CVS. Currently, unlike other kernels such as μClinux, the NetBSD kernel requires the presence of an MMU in any given target architecture.

NetBSD's portability is aided by the use of hardware abstraction layer interfaces for low-level hardware access such as bus input/output or DMA. Using this portability layer, device drivers can be split into "machine-independent" and "machine-dependent" components. This makes a single driver easily usable on several platforms by hiding hardware access details, and reduces the work to port it to a new system.

This permits a particular device driver for a PCI card to work without modifications, whether it is in a PCI slot on an IA-32, Alpha, PowerPC, SPARC, or other architecture with a PCI bus. Also, a single driver for a specific device can operate via several different buses, like ISA, PCI, or PC Card.

This platform independence aids the development of embedded systems, particularly since NetBSD 1.6, when the entire toolchain of compilers, assemblers, linkers, and other tools fully support cross-compiling.

In 2005, as a demonstration of NetBSD's portability and suitability for embedded applications, Technologic Systems, a vendor of embedded systems hardware, designed and demonstrated a NetBSD-powered kitchen toaster.

Commercial ports to embedded platforms, including the AMD Geode LX800, Freescale PowerQUICC processors, Marvell Orion, AMCC 405 family of PowerPC processors, Intel XScale IOP and IXP series, were available from and supported by Wasabi Systems.

Portable build framework 
The NetBSD cross-compiling framework (also known as "build.sh") lets a developer build a complete NetBSD system for an architecture from a more powerful system of different architecture (cross-compiling), including on a different operating system (the framework supports most POSIX-compliant systems). Several embedded systems using NetBSD have required no additional software development other than toolchain and target rehost.

The pkgsrc packages collection 

NetBSD features pkgsrc (short for "package source"), a framework for building and managing third-party application software packages. Building and installing packages such as KDE, GNOME, the Apache HTTP Server or Perl is performed through the use of a system of makefiles. This can automatically fetch the source code, unpack, patch, configure, build and install the package such that it can be removed again later. An alternative to compiling from source is to use a precompiled binary package. In either case, any prerequisites/dependencies will be installed automatically by the package system, without need for manual intervention.

pkgsrc supports not only NetBSD, but also several other BSD variants like FreeBSD and Darwin/Mac OS X, and other Unix-like operating systems such as Linux, Solaris, IRIX, and others, as well as Interix. pkgsrc was previously adopted as the official package management system for DragonFly BSD.

Symmetric multiprocessing 
NetBSD has supported SMP since the NetBSD 2.0 release in 2004, which was initially implemented using the giant lock approach. During the development cycle of the NetBSD 5 release, major work was done to improve SMP support; most of the kernel subsystems were modified to use the fine-grained locking approach. New synchronization primitives were implemented and scheduler activations was replaced with a 1:1 threading model in February 2007. A scalable M2 thread scheduler was implemented, though the old 4.4BSD scheduler still remains the default but was modified to scale with SMP. Threaded software interrupts were implemented to improve synchronization. The virtual memory system, memory allocator and trap handling were made MP safe. The file system framework, including the VFS and major file systems were modified to be MP safe. Since April 2008 the only subsystems running with a giant lock are the network protocols and most device drivers.

Security 
NetBSD provides various features in the security area. The Kernel Authorization framework (or Kauth) is a subsystem managing all authorization requests inside the kernel, and used as system-wide security policy. It allows external modules to plug-in the authorization process. NetBSD also incorporates exploit mitigation features, ASLR, KASLR, restricted mprotect() and Segvguard from the PaX project, and GCC Stack Smashing Protection (SSP, or also known as ProPolice, enabled by default since NetBSD 6.0) compiler extensions. Verified Executables (or Veriexec) is an in-kernel file integrity subsystem in NetBSD. It allows the user to set digital fingerprints (hashes) of files, and take a number of different actions if files do not match their fingerprints. For example, one can allow Perl to run only scripts that match their fingerprints. The cryptographic device driver (CGD) allows using disks or partitions (including CDs and DVDs) for encrypted storage.

Virtualization 
The Xen virtual-machine monitor has been supported in NetBSD since release 3.0. The use of Xen requires a special pre-kernel boot environment that loads a Xen-specialized kernel as the "host OS" (Dom0). Any number of "guest OSes" (DomU) virtualized computers, with or without specific Xen/DomU support, can be run in parallel with the appropriate hardware resources.

The need for a third-party boot manager, such as GRUB, was eliminated with NetBSD 5's Xen-compatible boot manager. NetBSD 6 as a Dom0 has been benchmarked comparably to Linux, with better performance than Linux in some tests.

As of NetBSD 9.0, accelerated virtualization is provided through the native hypervisor NVMM (NetBSD Virtual Machine Monitor).
It provides a virtualization API, libnvmm, that can be leveraged by emulators such as QEMU. A unique property of NVMM is that the kernel never accesses guest VM memory, only creating it.
Intel's Hardware Accelerated Execution Manager (HAXM) provides an alternative solution for acceleration in QEMU for Intel CPUs only, similar to Linux's KVM.

NetBSD 5.0 introduced the rump kernel, an architecture to run drivers in user-space by emulating kernel-space calls. This anykernel architecture allows adding support of NetBSD drivers to other kernel architectures, ranging from exokernels to monolithic kernels.

Storage 
NetBSD includes many enterprise features like iSCSI, a journaling filesystem, logical volume management and the ZFS filesystem.

The bio(4) interface for vendor-agnostic RAID volume management through bioctl has been available in NetBSD since 2007.

The WAPBL journaling filesystem, an extension of the BSD FFS filesystem, was contributed by Wasabi Systems in 2008.

The NetBSD Logical Volume Manager is based on a BSD reimplementation of a device-mapper driver and a port of the Linux Logical Volume Manager tools. It was mostly written during the Google Summer of Code 2008.

The ZFS filesystem developed by Sun Microsystems was imported into the NetBSD base system in 2009.

The CHFS Flash memory filesystem was imported into NetBSD in November 2011. CHFS is a file system developed at the Department of Software Engineering, University of Szeged, Hungary, and is the first open source Flash-specific file system written for NetBSD.

Compatibility with other operating systems 
At the source code level, NetBSD is very nearly entirely compliant with POSIX.1 (IEEE 1003.1-1990) standard and mostly compliant with POSIX.2 (IEEE 1003.2-1992).

NetBSD provides system call-level binary compatibility on the appropriate processor architectures with its previous releases, but also with several other UNIX-derived and UNIX-like operating systems, including Linux, and other 4.3BSD derivatives like SunOS 4. This allows NetBSD users to run many applications that are only distributed in binary form for other operating systems, usually with no significant loss of performance.

A variety of "foreign" disk filesystem formats are also supported in NetBSD, including ZFS, FAT, NTFS, Linux ext2fs, Apple HFS and OS X UFS, RISC OS FileCore/ADFS, AmigaOS Fast File System, IRIX EFS, Version 7 Unix File System, and many more through PUFFS.

Kernel scripting 

Kernel-space scripting with the Lua programming language was added in NetBSD 7.0. The Lua language (i.e., its interpreter and standard libraries) was initially ported to the NetBSD kernel during Google Summer of Code 2010 and has undergone several improvements since then. There are two main differences between user and kernel space Lua: kernel Lua does not support floating-point numbers; as such, only Lua integers are available. It also does not have full support to user space libraries that rely on the operating system (e.g., io and os).

Sensors 

NetBSD has featured a native hardware monitoring framework since 1999/2000, and in 2003, it served as the inspiration behind the OpenBSD's sysctl hw.sensors framework when some NetBSD drivers were being ported to OpenBSD.

, NetBSD had close to 85 device drivers exporting data through the API of the envsys framework.  Since the 2007 revision, serialisation of data between the kernel and userland is done through XML property lists with the help of NetBSD's proplib(3).

Uses 

NetBSD's clean design, high performance, scalability, and support for many architectures has led to its use in embedded devices and servers, especially in networking applications.

A commercial real-time operating system, QNX, uses a network stack based on NetBSD code, and provides various drivers ported from NetBSD.

Dell Force10 uses NetBSD as the underlying operating system that powers FTOS (the Force10 Operating System), which is used in high scalability switch/routers. Force10 also made a donation to the NetBSD Foundation in 2007 to help further research and the open development community.

Wasabi Systems provides a commercial Wasabi Certified BSD product based on NetBSD with proprietary enterprise features and extensions, which are focused on embedded, server and storage applications.

NetBSD was used in NASA's SAMS-II Project of measuring the microgravity environment on the International Space Station, and for investigations of TCP for use in satellite networks.

In 2004, SUNET used NetBSD to set the Internet2 Land Speed Record. NetBSD was chosen "due to the scalability of the TCP code".

NetBSD is also used in Apple's AirPort Extreme and Time Capsule products, instead of their own OS X (most of whose Unix-level userland code is derived from FreeBSD code but some is derived from NetBSD code).

The operating system of the T-Mobile Sidekick LX 2009 smartphone is based on NetBSD.

The Minix operating system uses a mostly NetBSD userland as well as its pkgsrc packages infrastructure since version 3.2.

Parts of macOS were originally taken from NetBSD, such as some userspace command line tools.

Licensing 
All of the NetBSD kernel and most of the core userland source code is released under the terms of the BSD License (two, three, and four-clause variants). This essentially allows everyone to use, modify, redistribute or sell it as they wish, as long as they do not remove the copyright notice and license text (the four-clause variants also include terms relating to publicity material). Thus, the development of products based on NetBSD is possible without having to make modifications to the source code public. In contrast, the GPL, which does not apply to NetBSD, stipulates that changes to source code of a product must be released to the product recipient when products derived from those changes are released.

On 20 June 2008, the NetBSD Foundation announced a transition to the two clause BSD license, citing concerns with UCB support of clause 3 and industry applicability of clause 4.

NetBSD also includes the GNU development tools and other packages, which are covered by the GPL and other open source licenses. As with other BSD projects, NetBSD separates those in its base source tree to make it easier to remove code that is under more restrictive licenses. As for packages, the installed software licenses may be controlled by modifying the list of allowed licenses in the pkgsrc configuration file (mk.conf).

Releases 
The following table lists major NetBSD releases and their notable features in reverse chronological order. Minor and patch releases are not included.

Logo 
The NetBSD "flag" logo, designed by Grant Bissett, was introduced in 2004 and is an abstraction of their older logo, designed by Shawn Mueller in 1994. Mueller's version was based on the famous World War II photograph Raising the Flag on Iwo Jima.

The NetBSD Foundation 
The NetBSD Foundation is the legal entity that owns the intellectual property and trademarks associated with NetBSD, and on 22 January 2004, became a 501(c)3 tax-exempt non-profit organization. The members of the foundation are developers who have CVS commit access. The NetBSD Foundation has a Board of Directors, elected by the voting of members for two years.

Hosting 
Hosting for the project is provided primarily by Columbia University, and Western Washington University, fronted by a CDN provided by Fastly. Mirrors for the project are spread around the world and provided by volunteers and supporters of the project.

See also 

 Comparison of operating systems
 Comparison of operating system kernels

References

External links 

 

 
ARM operating systems
Lightweight Unix-like systems
PowerPC operating systems
Software using the BSD license
1993 software
X86-64 operating systems
IA-32 operating systems